, is a completed drama manga series by Chiyo Rokuhana, first published in Japan in 2003. The IS of the title stands for intersex and the story follows the pain and troubles such people go through in their lives, such as gaining acceptance for who they are and their inability to reproduce.

Story 
The first volume of IS is a collection of stories about two different intersex characters and their separate troubles. Volumes 2 and onward deal with the life of intersex Haru Hoshino, starting just before his birth and continuing past high school.

Characters 
 Hiromi
 Hiromi was raised as a girl, and works as an office lady. She is the focus of the first part of the first volume.
 Ryoma
 Ryoma was raised as a boy, but later in the story changes her gender to female. She is the focus of the second part of the first volume. At the beginning of the story, Ryoma is a teenager.
 
 Haru Hoshino was born with both testicles and ovaries, but did not have sex reassignment surgery during infancy to make him look more like one gender than the other. At 10 months old he had to have his testicles removed due to a medical condition. From preschool through middle school, he always played with the boys his age in school, and is raised as a boy because of that. However in high school, because he was registered as female on his birth certificate, he is forced to live as a female for three years. His situation is complicated more by the fact his body is maturing in a more feminine way, such as developing breasts and menstruating, despite his wish to live as a boy. During his story faces struggles such as bullying and trying to accept his body for what it is, as well as making friends and falling in love.

Television drama
The manga was adapted into a ten-episode Japanese television drama, which was broadcast on TV Tokyo between July 18, and September 19, 2011. It starred Saki Fukuda as Haru Hoshino and Ayame Gōriki as Miwako Aihara, a girl that became a close friend of Hoshino. On November 25, 2011, all episodes were released on a DVD box set.

Reception
IS won the 2007 Kodansha Manga Award for shōjo manga.

References

External links 

 

2003 manga
Drama anime and manga
Josei manga
Kodansha manga
Romance anime and manga
TV Tokyo original programming
Winner of Kodansha Manga Award (Shōjo)
Intersex in fiction